Nageia maxima is a species of conifer in the family Podocarpaceae. It is found only in Borneo, where it is confined to Sarawak. It is threatened by habitat loss.

References

Podocarpaceae
Endemic flora of Borneo
Flora of Sarawak
Taxonomy articles created by Polbot
Taxa named by David John de Laubenfels
Flora of the Borneo lowland rain forests